Chris Polglase (born 12 January 1978, in Newcastle), known professionally as The Jungle Drummer, is an electronic music session drummer. He is most noted for his work with DJ Fu (who mixed and scratched while Polglase performed) and live drum and bass act London Elektricity.

References

British electronic musicians
British male drummers
Living people
1978 births
21st-century drummers
21st-century British male musicians